Sanskrit Cinema is a part of Indian cinema. Only 15 films have been made in Sanskrit have been made so far since 1983. There is no separate industry set for Sanskrit films.

History

The first Sanskrit film ever made was Adi Shankaracharya in 1983 by G.V. Iyer. At the 31st National Film Awards, it won four awards, including Best Film, Best Screenplay, Best Cinematography and Best Audiography.

The second film was Bhagavad Gita in 1992, again by G.V. Iyer. The film won the National Film Award for Best Feature Film at the 40th National awards for 1992. The next film made was in 2015, after a gap of 22 years.

From 2015 to 2017, 4 Sanskrit films were made in Kerala, India. Priyamanasam was the 3rd Sanskrit film and the first Sanskrit film from Kerala. The film won the award for 'Best Feature film in Sanskrit' at the 63rd National awards. The film was screened at the 46th International Film Festival of India (IFFI) in Goa in 2015. Ishti made in 2016 was the first Sanskrit film based on a social issue. The film was screened at the 47th International Film Festival of India (IFFI) in Goa in 2016, in the panorama section.

Suryakantha is the fifth Sanskrit film and the third one made in Kerala. It is the first Sanskrit film on contemporary life. The film won 'Special Jury award' in Kerala Film Critics Associations awards, 2017.

Anurakthi is the first Sanskrit 3D film with a song in the film picturised in 3D format. That also made Anurakthi the first Sanskrit film to have a song in it. The film was screened at the 48th International Film Festival of India (IFFI) in Goa in 2017.

Pratikriti is the first Commercial film in Sanskrit. This is written and directed by Dr. Nidheesh Gopi.

Punyakoti is the first animated film in Sanskrit.

Madhurasmitham World's First children's Sanskrit film. Directed by sureshgayathri 2019.Madhurasmitham won the Travancore International Award for Best Film.

Namo screened at IFFI in 2021 and its story resolve around friendship between Sudama and Sri Krishna.

List of Sanskrit films

References

Cinema of Karnataka
Cinema of Kerala
Cinema by language of India
Mass media in Sanskrit
Sanskrit revival